Promyshlennaya Arkhitektura (Russian for Industrial Architecture) was a Soviet punk band from Novosibirsk that existed from 1988 to 1989. It was founded by Dmitry Selivanov and was disbanded shortly following his death.

History
The band was founded in 1988 by Dmitry Selivanov a few weeks after his departure from Grazhdanskaya Oborona.

In 1988, the band recorded the album "Love and Technology" ("Любовь и технология") at the Electron Student Club of NETI. That same year, the album was discovered by the organizers of the Syrok Moscow Rock Festival, who then invited the band to perform at the event. However, the show was disrupted because the sound was turned off.

After their failure in Moscow, the band returned to Novosibirsk and recorded their concert in the Palace of Culture of Railway Workers. This became the basis for their album “Live Arhitekture,” which was almost a complete re-recording of their previous album.

The group disbanded after the suicide of Dmitry Selivanov in April 1989.

Reviews
Russian mathematician Misha Verbitsky:

Albums
 Love and Technology (1988)
 Live Arhitekture (1988)

Music videos
 The Children of the Hospitals

See also
 Zakrytoye Predpriyatiye

References

External links
 Dmitry Selivanov. Memorial Website Article. Дмитрий Селиванов. Статья на мемориальном сайте по материалам «Рок-сиб» В. Мурзина и интервью Р. Неумоева с Селивановым.
 Siberian post punk. Rossiyskaya Gazeta. Пост-панк по-сибирски. Российская газета. March 4, 2013.

Musical groups from Novosibirsk
Russian punk rock groups
Russian industrial music groups
Musical groups established in 1988
Musical groups disestablished in 1989